Redistribution of income and wealth is the transfer of income and wealth (including physical property) from some individuals to others through a social mechanism such as taxation, welfare, public services, land reform, monetary policies, confiscation, divorce or tort law. The term typically refers to redistribution on an economy-wide basis rather than between selected individuals.

Interpretations of the phrase vary, depending on personal perspectives, political ideologies and the selective use of statistics. It is frequently used in politics, where it is used to refer to perceived redistribution from those who have more to those who have less.

Occasionally, however, the term is used to describe laws or policies that cause redistribution in the opposite direction, from the poor to the rich.

The phrase is often coupled with the term class warfare, with high-income earners and the wealthy portrayed as victims of unfairness and discrimination.

Redistribution tax policy should not be confused with predistribution policies. "Predistribution" is the idea that the state should try to prevent inequalities from occurring in the first place rather than through the tax and benefits system once they have occurred. For example, a government predistribution policy might require employers to pay all employees a living wage and not just a minimum wage, as a "bottom-up" response to widespread income inequalities or high poverty rates.

Many alternate taxation proposals have been floated without the political will to alter the status quo. One example is the proposed "Buffett Rule", which is a hybrid taxation model composed of opposing systems intended to minimize the favoritism of special interests in tax design.

The effects of a redistributive system are actively debated on ethical and economic grounds. The subject includes an analysis of its rationales, objectives, means, and policy effectiveness.

History
In ancient times, redistribution operated as a palace economy. These economies were centrally based around the administration, meaning the dictator or pharaoh had both the ability and the right to say who was taxed and who received special treatment.

Another early form of wealth redistribution occurred in Plymouth Colony under the leadership of William Bradford.  Bradford recorded in his diary that this "common course" bred confusion, discontent, distrust, and the colonists looked upon it as a form of slavery.

A closely related term, distributism (also known as distributionism or distributivism), refers to an economic ideology that developed in Europe in the late 19th and early 20th century. It was based on the principles of Catholic social teaching, particularly the teachings of Pope Leo XIII in his encyclical Rerum Novarum and Pope Pius XI in Quadragesimo Anno. More recently, Pope Francis echoed the earlier Papal statements in his Evangelii Gaudium.

Role in economic systems 
Different types of economic systems feature varying degrees of interventionism aimed at redistributing income, depending on how unequal their initial distributions of income are. Free-market capitalist economies tend to feature high degrees of income redistribution. However, Japan's government engages in much less redistribution because its initial wage distribution is much more equal than Western economies. Likewise, the socialist planned economies of the former Soviet Union and Eastern bloc featured very little income redistribution because private capital and land income were restricted. To attain an efficient allocation of resources with the desired distribution of income, if the assumptions of the competitive model are satisfied by the economy, the sole role of the government is to alter the initial distribution of wealth – the major drivers of income inequality in capitalist systems – was virtually nonexistent; and because the wage rates were set by the government in these economies.

A comparison between Socialist and Capitalist Systems in terms of distribution of income is much easier as both these systems stand practically implemented in a number of countries under compatible political systems. Inequality in almost all the Eastern European economies has increased after moving from socialist controlled systems to market-based economies.

For the Islamic distribution, the following are the three key elements of the Islamic Economic System, which have significant implications for the distribution of income and wealth (if fully implemented) and are markedly different from Capitalism. The Islamic system is defined by the following three key elements: Ushr and Zakat, the prohibition of usury, and the Inheritance Law. Ushr is an obligatory payment from agriculture output at the time of harvesting. If agricultural land is irrigated by rain or some other natural freely available water the producer is obliged to pay ten percent of the output as Ushr.

In case irrigation water is not free of cost then the deduction would be five percent, while Zakat is a major instrument of restricting the excessive accumulation of wealth and helping the poor and most vulnerable members of the society, Secondly, usury, or charging interest, is prohibited. Elimination of interest from the economic system is a revolutionary step with profound effects on all spheres of economic activities. Finally, the Inheritance Law Of Islam is the distribution of the property of a deceased person from closest family members and moving towards a more distant family. Son(s), daughter(s), wife, husband and parents are the prime recipients. This distribution is explicitly illustrated in Qur’an and cannot be changed or modified. Under varying conditions, the share received by different relatives accordingly changes. The important principle is that the owner at the time of his/her death cannot change these shares.

How views on redistribution are formed 
The context that a person is in can influence their views on redistributive policies. For example, despite both being Western civilizations, typical Americans and Europeans do not have the same views on redistribution policies. This phenomenon persists even among people who would benefit most from redistributive policies, as poor Americans tend to favor redistributive policy less than equally poor Europeans. Research shows this is because when a society has a fundamental belief that those who work hard will earn rewards from their work, the society will favor lower redistributive policies. However, when a society as a whole believes that some combination of outside factors, such as luck or corruption, can contribute to determining one's wealth, those in the society will tend to favor higher redistributive policies. This leads to fundamentally different ideas of what is ‘just’ or fair in these countries and influences their overall views on redistribution.  

Another context that can influence one's ideas of redistributive policies is the social class that one is born into. People tend to favor redistributive policy that will help the groups that they are a member of.  This is displayed in a study of Latin American lawmakers, where it is shown that lawmakers born into a lower social class tend to favor more redistributive policies than their counterparts born into a higher social class. Research has also found that women generally support redistribution more than men do, though the strength of this preference varies across countries. While literature remains mixed on if monetary gain is the true motivation behind favoring redistributive policies, most researchers accept that social class plays some role in determining someone's views towards redistributive policies. Nonetheless, the classic theory that individual preferences for redistribution decrease with their income, leading to societal preferences for redistribution that increase with income inequality has been disputed. Perhaps the most important impact of government on the distribution of “wealth” is in the sphere of education—in ensuring that everyone has a certain amount of human capital. By providing all individuals, regardless of the wealth of their parents, with a free basic education, government reduces the degree of inequality that otherwise would exist.

Income inequality has many different connotations, three of which are of particular importance: (1) The moral dimension, which leads into the discussion of human rights. What kinds of reasons should a society accept for the emergence or existence of inequality and how much inequality between its members is reconcilable with the right of each individual to human dignity? (2) The second dimension links inequality to political stability. How much inequality can a society endure before a significant number of its members begin to reject the existing pattern of distribution and demand fundamental changes? In societies with very rigid forms of the income distribution, this may easily lead to public protest, if not violence. Authorities are then faced with the option of reacting to protests with repression or reform. In societies with flexible tools of negotiation and bargaining on income, smoother mechanisms of adaptation may be available. (3) The third dimension – in many cases the dominant pattern in the social debate – links inequality to economic performance. Individuals who achieve more and perform better deserve a higher income. If everybody is treated the same, the overall willingness to work may decline. The argument includes the scarcity of skills. Societies have to provide incentives to ensure that talents and education are allocated to jobs where they are needed most. Not many people doubt the general accuracy of these arguments – but nobody has ever shown how to correctly measure performance and how to find an objective way of linking it to the prevailing level of the income distribution. Inequality is needed – to some extent – but nobody knows how much of it is good.

Inequality in developing countries
The existence of high inequality within many developing countries, alongside persistent poverty, began to draw attention in the early 1970s. However, throughout the 1980s and into the 1990s, the dominant view among development economists was that inequality in poor countries was a less pressing issue compared to ensuring sufficient growth, which was believed to be the primary means of reducing poverty. The policy recommendation for developing countries was clear: it was not possible to simultaneously decrease poverty and inequality. This perspective was based on the belief that economic growth would eventually lead to a trickle-down effect, where the benefits of growth would eventually reach the poorest members of society. However, evidence began to emerge in the 1990s that challenged this notion and suggested that the link between economic growth and poverty reduction was not as strong as previously thought. This shift in thinking led to a reconsideration of the importance of addressing inequality in the pursuit of development.

Modern forms of redistribution 
The redistribution of wealth and its practical application are bound to change with the continuous evolution of social norms, politics, and culture. Within developed countries income inequality has become a widely popular issue that has dominated the debate stage for the past few years. The importance of a nation's ability to redistribute wealth in order to implement social welfare programs, maintain public goods, and drive economic development has brought various conversations to the political arena. A country's means of redistributing wealth comes from the implementation of a carefully thought out well described system of taxation. The implementation of such a system would aid in achieving the desired social and economic objective of diminishing social inequality and maximizing social welfare. There are various ways to impose a tax system that will help create a more efficient allocation of resources, in particular, many democratic, even socialist governments utilize a progressive system of taxation to achieve a certain level of income redistribution. In addition to the creation and implementation of these tax systems, "globalization of the world economy [has] provided incentives for reforming the tax systems" across the globe. Along with utilizing a system of taxation to achieve the redistribution of wealth, the same socio-economic benefit can be achieved if there are appropriate policies enacted within a current political infrastructure that addresses these issues. Modern thinking towards the topic of the redistribution of wealth, focuses on the concept that economic development increases the standard of living across an entire society.

Today, income redistribution occurs in some form in most democratic countries, through economic policies. Some redistributive policies attempt to take wealth, income, and other resources from the "haves" and give them to the "have-nots", but many redistributions go elsewhere.

For example, the U.S. government's progressive-rate income tax policy is redistributive because much tax revenue goes to social programs such as welfare and Medicare.

In a progressive income tax system, a high income earner will pay a higher tax rate (a larger percentage of their income) than a low income earner; and therefore, will pay more total dollars per person.

Other taxation-based methods of redistributing income are the negative income tax for very low income earners and tax loopholes (tax avoidance) for the better-off.

Two other common types of governmental redistribution of income are subsidies and vouchers (such as food stamps or Section-8 housing vouchers). These transfer payment programs are funded through general taxation, but benefit the poor or influential special interest groups and corporations. While the persons receiving transfers from such programs may prefer to be directly given cash, these programs may be more palatable to society than cash assistance, as they give society some measure of control over how the funds are spent.

In addition to having a progressive tax rate, the U.S. Social Security system also redistributes wealth to the poor via its highly progressive benefit formula.

Governmental redistribution of income may include a direct benefit program involving either cash transfers or the purchase of specific services for an individual. Medicare is one example. Medicare is a government-run health insurance program that covers people age 65 or older, certain younger people with disabilities, and people with end-stage renal disease (permanent kidney failure requiring dialysis or a transplant, sometimes called ESRD). This is a direct benefit program because the government is directly providing health insurance for those who qualify.

The difference between the Gini index for the income distribution before taxation and the Gini index after taxation is an indicator for the effects of such taxation.

Wealth redistribution can be implemented through land reform that transfers ownership of land from one category of people to another, or through inheritance taxes, land value taxes or a broader wealth tax on assets in general. Before-and-after Gini coefficients for the distribution of wealth can be compared.

Interventions like rent control can impose large costs. Some alternative forms of interventions, such as housing subsidies, may achieve comparable distributional objectives at less cost. If the government cannot costlessly
redistribute, it should look for efficient ways of redistributing—that is, ways that reduce the costs as much as possible. This is one of the main concerns of the branch of economics called the economics of the public sector.

Class analysis
One study suggests that "the middle class faces a paradoxical status" in that they tend to vote against income redistribution, even though they would benefit economically from it.

Objectives
The objectives of income redistribution are to increase economic stability and opportunity for the less wealthy members of society and thus usually include the funding of public services.

One basis for redistribution is the concept of distributive justice, whose premise is that money and resources ought to be distributed in such a way as to lead to a socially just, and possibly more financially egalitarian, society. Another argument is that a larger middle class benefits an economy by enabling more people to be consumers, while providing equal opportunities for individuals to reach a better standard of living. Seen for example in the work of John Rawls, another argument is that a truly fair society would be organized in a manner benefiting the least advantaged, and any inequality would be permissible only to the extent that it benefits the least advantaged.

Some proponents of redistribution argue that capitalism results in an externality that creates unequal wealth distribution.

Many economists have argued that wealth and income inequality are a cause of economic crises, and that reducing these inequalities is one way to prevent or ameliorate economic crises, with redistribution thus benefiting the economy overall. This view was associated with the underconsumptionism school in the 19th century, now considered an aspect of some schools of Keynesian economics; it has also been advanced, for different reasons, by Marxian economics. It was particularly advanced in the US in the 1920s by Waddill Catchings and William Trufant Foster. More recently, the so-called "Rajan hypothesis" posited that income inequality was at the basis of the explosion of the 2008 financial crisis. The reason is that rising inequality caused  people on low and middle incomes, particularly in the US, to increase their debt to keep up their consumption levels with that of richer people. Borrowing was particularly high in the housing market and deregulation in the financial sector made it possible to extend lending in sub-prime mortgages. The downturn in the housing market in 2007 halted this process and triggered the financial crisis. Nobel Prize laureate Joseph Stiglitz, along with many others, supports this view.

There is currently a debate concerning the extent to which the world's extremely rich have become richer over recent decades. Thomas Piketty's Capital in the Twenty-First Century is at the forefront of the debate, mainly focusing on within-country concentration of income and wealth. Branko Milanovic provided evidence of increasing inequality at the global level, showing how the group of so-called "global plutocrats", i.e. the richest 1% in the world income distribution, were the main beneficiaries of economic growth in the period 1988–2008. More recent analysis supports this claim, as 27% of total economic growth worldwide accrued to the top 1% of the world income distribution in the period 1980–2016.  The approach underpinning these analyses has been critiqued in certain publications such as The Economist.

Moral obligation 

Peter Singer's argument contrasts to Thomas Pogge's in that he states we have an individual moral obligation to help the poor.
The rich people who are living in the states with more redistribution, are more in favor of immigrants than poorer people, because this can make them pay less wages.

Economic effects of inequality

Using statistics from 23 developed countries and the 50 states of the US, British researchers Richard G. Wilkinson and Kate Pickett show a correlation between income inequality and higher rates of health and social problems (obesity, mental illness, homicides, teenage births, incarceration, child conflict, drug use), and lower rates of social goods (life expectancy, educational performance, trust among strangers, women's status, social mobility, even numbers of patents issued per capita), on the other. The authors argue inequality leads to the social ills through the psychosocial stress, status anxiety it creates.

A 2011 report by the International Monetary Fund by Andrew G. Berg and Jonathan D. Ostry found a strong association between lower levels of inequality and sustained periods of economic growth. Developing countries (such as Brazil, Cameroon, Jordan) with high inequality have "succeeded in initiating growth at high rates for a few years" but "longer growth spells are robustly associated with more equality in the income distribution."
The Industrial Revolution led to increasing inequality among nations. Some economies took off, whereas others, like
many of those in Africa or Asia, remained close to a subsistence standard of living. General calculations show that
the 17 countries of the world with the most-developed economies had, on average, 2.4 times the GDP per capita of
the world’s poorest economies in 1870. By 1960, the most developed economies had 4.2 times the GDP per capita of
the poorest economies.
Regarding to GDP indicator, GDP has nothing to say about the level of inequality in society. GDP per capita is only an average. When GDP per capita rises by 5%, it could mean that GDP for everyone in the society has risen by 5%, or that GDP of some groups has risen by more while that of others has risen by less—or even declined.

Criticism
Public choice theory states that redistribution tends to benefit those with political clout to set spending priorities more than those in need, who lack real influence on government.

The socialist economists John Roemer and Pranab Bardhan criticize redistribution via taxation in the context of Nordic-style social democracy, reportedly highlighting its limited success at promoting relative egalitarianism and its lack of sustainability. They point out that social democracy requires a strong labor movement to sustain its heavy redistribution, and that it is unrealistic to expect such redistribution to be feasible in countries with weaker labor movements. They point out that, even in the Scandinavian countries, social democracy has been in decline since the labor movement weakened. Instead, Roemer and Bardhan argue that changing the patterns of enterprise ownership and market socialism, obviating the need for redistribution, would be more sustainable and effective at promoting egalitarianism.

Marxian economists argue that social democratic reforms – including policies to redistribute income – such as unemployment benefits and high taxes on profits and the wealthy create more contradictions in capitalism by further limiting the efficiency of the capitalist system via reducing incentives for capitalists to invest in further production. In the Marxist view, redistribution cannot resolve the fundamental issues of capitalism – only a transition to a socialist economy can.
Income redistribution will lower poverty by reducing inequality, if done properly. But it may not accelerate growth in any major way, except perhaps by reducing social tensions arising from inequality and allowing poor people to devote more resources to human and physical asset accumulation. Directly investing in opportunities for poor people is essential.

The distribution of income that emerges from competitive markets may be very unequal. However, under the
conditions of the basic competitive model, a redistribution of wealth can move the economy to a more equal allocation that is also Pareto efficient.

See also
 Basic income
 Distribution of wealth
 Economic policy
 Equality of outcome
 Guaranteed minimum income
 Poverty reduction
 Robin Hood
 Robin Hood tax
 Social inequality
 Redistribution (cultural anthropology)
 Wealth concentration
 Wealth tax
 Lima Declaration
 To each according to one's needs

Lists:
 List of countries by income equality
 List of countries by inequality-adjusted HDI

Opposite tendencies:
 Accumulation by dispossession
 Primitive accumulation of capital
 Reserve army of labour

References

External links

Politics by issue
Taxation and redistribution
Public economics
Political philosophy
Egalitarianism
Social democracy
Democratic socialism